The 1991 Masters Tournament was the 55th Masters Tournament held April 11–14 at Augusta National Golf Club in Augusta, Georgia.  Ian Woosnam won his only major title, one stroke ahead of runner-up José María Olazábal.

Woosnam, Olazábal, and two-time champion Tom Watson, age 41, were all tied at −11 going into the 72nd hole. Olazábal, a group ahead of the final pairing of Woosnam and Watson, went from fairway bunker to greenside bunker and failed to hole a  par putt. Watson, who had eagled both 13 and 15, missed the fairway right with his tee shot and then hit his second shot into a greenside bunker. He chipped out and three-putted for a double bogey. Woosnam then holed an  par putt for the green jacket.

It was the fourth consecutive year that the Masters champion was from the United Kingdom, which had no winners prior to Sandy Lyle's victory in 1988. Through 2017, Woosnam is the only winner at Augusta from Wales.  Olazábal later won two Masters, in 1994 and 1999.

Phil Mickelson, a 20-year-old junior at Arizona State, was the low amateur at 290 (+2) and tied for 46th place.

Field
1. Masters champions
Tommy Aaron, George Archer, Seve Ballesteros (3,9), Gay Brewer, Billy Casper, Charles Coody, Ben Crenshaw (9,12), Nick Faldo (3,10), Raymond Floyd (2,9), Doug Ford, Bernhard Langer (9), Sandy Lyle, Larry Mize (9,10,13), Jack Nicklaus (9), Arnold Palmer, Gary Player (9), Craig Stadler (9,10), Tom Watson (9,14), Fuzzy Zoeller (9,10)

Jack Burke Jr., Bob Goalby, Ben Hogan, Herman Keiser, Cary Middlecoff, Byron Nelson, Henry Picard, Gene Sarazen, Sam Snead, and Art Wall Jr. did not play.

2. U.S. Open champions (last five years)
Hale Irwin (12,13), Scott Simpson (9,10), Curtis Strange (9,14)

3. The Open champions (last five years)
Mark Calcavecchia (9,13,14), Greg Norman (10,12,13)

4. PGA champions (last five years)
Wayne Grady (13), Larry Nelson (10), Jeff Sluman (10), Bob Tway (12,13)

Payne Stewart (11,12,13,14) was injured and did not play

5. U.S. Amateur champion and runner-up
Phil Mickelson (a,12), Manny Zerman (a)

6. The Amateur champion
Rolf Muntz (a)

7. U.S. Amateur Public Links champion
Michael Combs (a)

8. U.S. Mid-Amateur champion
Jim Stuart (a)

9. Top 24 players and ties from the 1990 Masters
Bill Britton (11), Fred Couples (11,13,14), Donnie Hammond, Scott Hoch (10), John Huston (10,13), Steve Jones (10), Tom Kite (12,13,14), José María Olazábal (10,12), Masashi Ozaki, Ronan Rafferty, Lee Trevino, Lanny Wadkins (12,13,14)

10. Top 16 players and ties from the 1990 U.S. Open
Jim Benepe, Mark Brooks, Billy Ray Brown, Mike Donald, John Inman, Tom Sieckmann, Tim Simpson (11,12,13)

11. Top eight players and ties from 1990 PGA Championship
Chip Beck (12,13,14), Billy Mayfair (13), Mark McNulty, Gil Morgan (12,13), Don Pooley, Loren Roberts (13)

12. Winners of PGA Tour events since the previous Masters
Paul Azinger (13,14), Jay Don Blake, Steve Elkington (13), David Frost, Jim Gallagher Jr. (13), Morris Hatalsky, Nolan Henke, Kenny Knox, Wayne Levi (13), Davis Love III (13), Andrew Magee, Rocco Mediate, Jodie Mudd (13), Mark O'Meara (13,14), Steve Pate, Corey Pavin (13), Ted Schulz, Joey Sindelar, Ian Woosnam

Peter Persons, the winner of the Chattanooga Classic was not invited.

13. Top 30 players from the 1990 PGA Tour money list
John Cook, Ian Baker-Finch, Robert Gamez, Peter Jacobsen, Nick Price, Brian Tennyson

14. Members of the U.S. 1989 Ryder Cup team
Ken Green, Mark McCumber

15. Special foreign invitation
Frankie Miñoza, Tsuneyuki Nakajima

Round summaries

First round
Thursday, April 11, 1991

Second round
Friday, April 12, 1991

Amateurs: Mickelson (−2), Zerman (−2), Stuart (+9), Combs (+11), Muntz (+11)

Source:

Third round
Saturday, April 13, 1991

Final round
Sunday, April 14, 1991

Final leaderboard

Sources:

Scorecard

Cumulative tournament scores, relative to par
{|class="wikitable" span = 50 style="font-size:85%;
|-
|style="background: Red;" width=10|
|Eagle
|style="background: Pink;" width=10|
|Birdie
|style="background: PaleGreen;" width=10|
|Bogey
|style="background: Green;" width=10|
|Double bogey
|}
Source:

References

External links
Masters.com – Past winners and results
Augusta.com – 1991 Masters leaderboard and scorecards

1991
1991 in golf
1991 in American sports
1991 in sports in Georgia (U.S. state)
April 1991 sports events in the United States